Kosbach is a village on the outskirts of Erlangen, Germany. The village is known locally for its own Kirchweih festival, the Kosbacher Karpfen Kirchweih, which is a celebration at which carp is consumed en masse. The village is surrounded by carp ponds. The ponds are lined with nets, a month or so before the festival the nets are raised so the fish are off the bottom and the muddiness is rinsed away. In 1985 there were a disproportionate number of teenagers in the town, by far outnumbering the adults.

Erlangen
Villages in Bavaria